Jørgen Buckhøj (10 January 1935 – 13 April 1994) was a Danish actor, working on stage, TV and film. He is best known as the title character Mads Skjern (born Mads Andersen-Skjern) in Matador. He appeared in 38 films between 1953 and 1977.

He was born and died in Denmark.  His parents were actors Henny Lindorff Buckhøj and Per Buckhøj.

Filmography

 Pas på ryggen, professor (1977)
 Ægteskabet mellem lyst og nød (1975)
 Anne og Paul (1975)
 Gamle dage (1974)
 Syg og munter (1974)
 Snart dages det brødre (1974)
 Bulen (1973)
 Tango (1973)
 Næsehornet (1972)
 Teknikerne (1972)
 Huset i baggården (1971)
 Til lykke Hansen (1971)
 Nattens frelse (1971)
 Forfremmelsen (1971)
 Dimensionspigen (1970)
 The Only Way (1970)
 Værelset (1970)
 Nøglen til paradis (1970)
 Arseniktimen (1970)
 Bella (1970)
 De unge på 80 (1970)
 Tænk på et tal (1969)
 Henrik IV (1968)
 Min søsters børn på bryllupsrejse (1967)
 Smukke-Arne og Rosa (1967)
 Historien om Barbara (1967)
 Støv for alle pengene (1963)
 Gudrun (1963)
 Landsbylægen (1961)
 Far til fire med fuld musik (1961)
 Soldaterkammerater på efterårsmanøvre (1961)
 Sorte Shara (1961)
 Jetpiloter (1961)
 Skibet er ladet med (1960)
 Seksdagesløbet (1958)
 Bundfald (1957)
 Gengæld (1955)
 Adam og Eva (1953)

External links

1935 births
1994 deaths
Danish male film actors
20th-century Danish male actors

People from Aarhus